Yaakov Ariel is the chief rabbi of the city of Ramat Gan, Israel, and one of the leading rabbis of the religious Zionist movement. Ariel had served as the rosh yeshiva of the yeshiva in the abandoned Israeli settlement of Yamit in the Sinai Peninsula until 1982, and is currently the president of the Ramat Gan Yeshiva (roshei yeshiva are Rabbis Yehoshua Shapira and Ben-Tzion Moshe Elgazi). He also served as the rabbi of Kfar Maimon for about 25 years.

Born in Jerusalem, Rabbi Ariel learned at the Bnei Akiva Yeshiva in Kfar HaRoeh, Midreshet Noam in Pardes Hana, and Mercaz HaRav in Jerusalem. At Mercaz HaRav, he was one of the most important students of Rabbi Tzvi Yehuda HaCohen Kook.

In 2003, Ariel was a leading candidate for the Israeli Ashkenazi Chief Rabbi, but lost due to opposition from the ultra-Orthodox. His brother, Rabbi Yisrael Ariel, is the former chief rabbi of Yamit and founder of the Temple Institute.

In September 2017, Rabbi Ariel announced that, having reached the age of 80, he was stepping down as rabbi of Ramat Gan.

His Pupils
 Rabbi Shlomo Levi, chief rabbi of Kiryat Shmona.
 Rabbi Yehuda Amichay, the rabbi of Torah and the Land institute.

Books
 "Rising from the Desert"- Olah Min Hamidbar. About the building and destruction of Yamit.
 "In the Tent of the Torah"- B'Ohala Shel Torah. Answers to Halachic questions; five volumes.
 "From the tents of Torah"- Mei Ohalei HaTorah. Essays on the Jewish festivals and Chumash; two volumes.
 "Halacha in Our Times" - Halacha b'Yameinu
 "He Who Dwells in Tents" - Yosheiv Ohalim. Lectures on the Talmudic tractates Ketubot and Kiddushin.

References

External links
Official site 

Religious Zionist Orthodox rabbis
Living people
Year of birth missing (living people)
Chief rabbis of cities in Israel
Mercaz HaRav alumni
Chardal